This article lists important figures and events in Malaysian public affairs during the year 1978, together with births and deaths of notable Malaysians.

Incumbent political figures

Federal level
Yang di-Pertuan Agong: Sultan Yahya Petra
Raja Permaisuri Agong: Raja Perempuan Zainab
Prime Minister: Tun Hussein Onn
Deputy Prime Minister: Dato' Dr Mahathir Mohamad
Lord President: Mohamed Suffian Mohamed Hashim

State level
 Sultan of Johor: Sultan Ismail
 Sultan of Kedah: Sultan Abdul Halim Muadzam Shah
 Sultan of Kelantan: Tengku Ismail Petra (Regent)
 Raja of Perlis: Tuanku Syed Putra
 Sultan of Perak: Sultan Idris Shah II
 Sultan of Pahang: Sultan Ahmad Shah (Deputy Yang di-Pertuan Agong)
 Sultan of Selangor: Sultan Salahuddin Abdul Aziz Shah
 Sultan of Terengganu: Sultan Ismail Nasiruddin Shah
 Yang di-Pertuan Besar of Negeri Sembilan: Tuanku Jaafar
 Yang di-Pertua Negeri (Governor) of Penang: Tun Sardon Jubir
 Yang di-Pertua Negeri (Governor) of Malacca: Tun Syed Zahiruddin bin Syed Hassan
 Yang di-Pertua Negeri (Governor) of Sarawak: Tun Abang Muhammad Salahuddin
 Yang di-Pertua Negeri (Governor) of Sabah:
Tun Datuk Ahmad Koroh (until November)
Tun Mohd Adnan Robert (from November)

Events
8 July – 1978 Malaysian General Elections
7 December – Shah Alam became the capital of Selangor
28 December – Colour television was introduced by Radio Television Malaysia on RTM1

Births
3 January - Erry Putra - Singer, actor 
28 March – Shalin Zulkifli – Bowling queen
18 April – Fazley Yaakob – celebrity chef
13 June – Faizal Yusof – Malaysian actor (died 2011)
6 July – Daphne Iking – Celebrity
4 December – Jaclyn Victor – Singer and winner of Malaysian Idol (season 1)

Deaths
25 June – Ahmad Koroh AlHaj – Sabah State Governor (1977-1978)

See also
 1978
 1977 in Malaysia | 1979 in Malaysia
 History of Malaysia

 
Years of the 20th century in Malaysia
Malaysia
Malaysia
1970s in Malaysia